Žagar may refer to:

 Žagar (band)
 Žagar (surname)